
An area code overlay is a numbering plan area (NPA) in the North American Numbering Plan (NANP) that has multiple area codes assigned. Overlay plans are used to increase the number of available telephone numbers in a province, state, or region.

The North American Numbering Plan Administrator (NANPA) maintains the definitive list of overlays in the United States.
The majority of overlays have occurred since 1995. The process has been driven by fragmentation of numbering resources by a growing number of competitive local exchange carriers.

Active area code overlays

Pending and planned overlays

Various new area codes are planned or proposed. A few overlay implementations (247 WI, 354 QC, 679 MI, 870 AR, 975 MO, et al.) have been suspended, often because wasteful allocation of telephone numbers has been mitigated by number pooling or other conservation efforts.

274 was assigned for an overlay of 920, originally scheduled for 2012, then postponed to 2014, and finally indefinitely postponed.
354 was assigned for an overlay of 450 and 579, originally scheduled for October 24, 2020, but the additional overlay has been postponed indefinitely.
387 is reserved as a future overlay for 416.
428 is planned for overlay of 506 starting on April 29, 2023.
557 is planned for overlay of 314 starting in August 2022.
564 currently overlays 360, but will expand to overlay area codes 206, 253, and 425 as those Seattle-area codes run out of numbers.
656 is planned for an overlay of 813 in mid-to-late February 2022.
679, planned to overlay 313 in Michigan., indefinitely postponed.
728, planned to overlay 561 in Florida, to go into effect March 2023
730 is reserved as a future overlay for 618 in southern Illinois, expected to go into effect on July 7, 2023.
742 is reserved as a future overlay for 905.
826 will overlay 540 in Virginia on June 14, 2022.
[[Area code list|835 is proposed to overlay 610 and 484. This plan has been suspended by the Pennsylvania Public Utilities Commission.
861 is reserved as a future overlay for 309 in western Illinois, expected to go into effect on February 24, 2023.
879 is planned to overlay 709 in Newfoundland and Labrador. The official implementation date has been postponed indefinitely.
948 is planned for an overlay of 757 on May 9, 2022.
983 is planned for an overlay of 303 and 720 on April 12, 2022.

References

North American Numbering Plan